Anastasia Dmytruk (born 31 January 1991, in Nizhyn) is a Ukrainian poet who writes in the Russian and Ukrainian languages. She writes poetry and has worked as an information security specialist after graduating from Kyiv Polytechnic Institute. Never ever can we be brothers, written in Russian, has become her most widely cited poem.

The poem was written in response to the Russian occupation of Crimea in 2014. The poem celebrates the 2014 Ukrainian revolution and rejects "Great Russia":
Freedom’s foreign to you, unattained;
From your childhood, you’ve been chained.
In your home, “silence is golden” prevails,
But we’re raising up Molotov cocktails.
In our hearts, blood is boiling, sizzling.
And you’re kin? – you blind ones, miserly?
There’s no fear in our eyes; it’s effortless,
We are dangerous even weaponless.
According to literary critics, the poem might have been influenced by Russian translation of the "Britons never will be slaves!" or by Marina Tsvetayeva.

The YouTube video of Dmitruk reading her poem went viral, quickly accumulating more than a million hits. A song based on the poem was created by musicians from Klaipeda.  It also quickly accumulated more than a million hits. The poem was hotly debated in the press and received many thousand responses from Russian and Ukrainian audience It became a target of many parodies, especially by Russian readers who considered the poem "Russophobic" According to Yuri Loza, the "elder Russian brothers" in the poem appear as the reincarnation of Big Brother from Nineteen Eighty-Four It is one of the two most popular poems which were written in Ukraine immediately following the Euromaidan.

References

External links
Her Youtube channel
Her Facebook account
Youtube video, with Dmitruk reading her poem 
YouTube Video of song on poem by Dmitruk
Her poems on VK

Russian-language poets
Ukrainian women poets
Living people
People of the Euromaidan
1991 births
People from Nizhyn
21st-century Ukrainian poets
21st-century Ukrainian women writers
Laureates of the Prize of the Cabinet of Ministers of Ukraine for special achievements of youth in the development of Ukraine